Chalcis Province was one of the provinces of the Euboea Prefecture, Greece. Its territory corresponded with that of the current municipalities Chalcis, Dirfys-Messapia, Eretria, and Mantoudi-Limni-Agia Anna. It was abolished in 2006.

References

Provinces of Greece